Mohammed Maigari Dingyadi (born 1953) is a Nigerian Minister of Police Affairs appointed on August 19, 2019 by President Muhammed Buhari.

Dingyadi was born in Dingyadi, Sokoto. He is a 1978 graduate of Ahmadu Bello University.

References 

Federal ministers of Nigeria
1953 births
Living people